White Bear was a 40-gun ship of the English Tudor navy, launched in 1563. She was repaired in 1585–86 at Woolwich, and recommissioned under Lord Howard of Effingham. In 1588 she took part in the actions against the Spanish Armada, under the command of Lord Edmund Sheffield. She was rebuilt in 1599 as a 57-gun royal ship.

The White Bear remained in service until 1627, when she was deemed unserviceable, and was sold out of the navy at Rochester on 12 June 1629.

The timbers from the White Bear were used to rebuild a burned-down alehouse on the Old Packhorse track running between Halifax and Leeds (now known as The Old White Beare in the village of Norwood Green near Halifax). There is also another pub called "the White Bear" in Bedale (North Yorkshire), which is named after the vessel. The pub sign is adorned with a ship.

Notes

References
Citations

Bibliography

Lavery, Brian (2003) The Ship of the Line - Volume 1: The development of the battlefleet 1650-1850. Conway Maritime Press. .

Winfield, Rif (2009) British Warships in the Age of Sail 1603-1714: Design, Construction, Careers and Fate. Seaforth Publishing. .
https://web.archive.org/web/20100205233511/http://www.oldwhitebeare.com/History.html

Ships of the English navy
16th-century ships